Kiss TV is a commercial hip-hop and dance music television channel owned by Channel Four Television , with permission to use the Kiss brand from Bauer Media Audio UK. The playlist predominantly consists of old skool and mainstream hip-hop, grime, EDM/Dance and R&B.

It is based on the format of the Bauer owned national radio station Kiss.

History 
The original incarnation of Kiss TV was created by Guy Wingate, was bought back in to head up EMAP's fledgling TV division by then Kiss Chief Executive and the station's original founder, Gordon 'Mac' McNamee. The channel ran for one hour a night on the Mirror Group's L!VE TV cable circuit and after a year moved up to the Granada satellite and cable platform, taking a similar slot in the evening.

Although the original idea for the channel was proposed in 1993 (three years after Kiss FM launched as a legal station).

The channel's presenters included DJs such as BBC Radio 1's Judge Jules. By the time the channel was one year old, it had attracted major sponsorship from blue-chip brands such as Levi's, Sony consumer products and The Guardian.

The channel is available on digital television platforms and is part of a network of channels owned by The Box Plus Network. On 2 April 2013, all Box Television channels went free-to-air on satellite, apart from 4Music which went free-to-view. As a result, the channels were removed from the Sky EPG in Ireland. However, Kiss TV launched on Freesat on 15 April 2013, alongside three other Box Television channels. Kiss TV and its sister channels returned to Freesat on 8 December 2021.

Kiss TV also broadcasts in Sub-Saharan Africa as a Pay-TV channel, through various digital TV providers without commercials. Music videos are played in place of commercials.

See also
Kiss Network
Kiss 100 London
Kiss 101
Kiss 105-108

References

External links

      

Channel 4 television channels
Music video networks in the United Kingdom
Television channels and stations established in 1998
Kiss Network